Jorge Antônio Putinatti, or better known as Jorginho Putinatti (born 23 August 1959 in Marília, Brazil) is a Brazilian former footballer who played as a midfielder.

Club career
At club level, Jorginho started his career with his hometown team Marília in 1976, and went on to play for several other Brazilian clubs, spending most of his career with Palmeiras, and later winning the 1989 Campeonato Gaúcho with Grêmio. He ended his career in 1994, after playing in Japan for four years with Nagoya Grampus Eight.

International career
At international level, Jorginho represented the Brazil national football team on 16 occasions between 1983 and 1985, scoring two goals. He was a member of the side that reached the final of the 1983 Copa América.

Style of play
Jorginho was an offensive–minded midfielder, who usually played as a right winger, although he was also capable of playing in a more central role as an attacking midfielder, or even as a forward.

Career statistics

Club

International

Honours

Club
Marília
Copa São Paulo de Futebol Júnior: 1979

Grêmio
Campeonato Gaúcho: 1989

International
Brazil
Copa América (runner-up): 1983

Individual
Bola de Prata: 1979, 1983, 1986
Japan Soccer League Team of the Year: 1990–91, 1991–92

References

External links
 

 
 

1959 births
Living people
People from Marília
Brazilian footballers
Brazilian expatriate footballers
Brazil international footballers
Marília Atlético Clube players
Sociedade Esportiva Palmeiras players
Sport Club Corinthians Paulista players
Grêmio Foot-Ball Porto Alegrense players
Guarani FC players
Santos FC players
Esporte Clube XV de Novembro (Piracicaba) players
Japan Soccer League players
J1 League players
Campeonato Brasileiro Série A players
Nagoya Grampus players
Expatriate footballers in Japan
1983 Copa América players
Association football midfielders
Footballers from São Paulo (state)